Richard L. Rashke (born 1936) is an American journalist, teacher and author, who has written non-fiction books, as well as plays and screenplays. He is especially known for his history, Escape from Sobibor, first published in 1982, an account of the mass escape in October 1943 of hundreds of Jewish prisoners from the extermination camp at Sobibor in German-occupied Poland. The book was adapted as a 1987 TV movie by the same name.

Early life and education
Richard Rashke was born in Milwaukee, Wisconsin, to Guy and Angeline (Luksich) Rashke. He had an older brother Donald. Richard attended local schools and has a master's degree in journalism from American University.

Literary career
After working as a journalist, Rashke started pursuing his own topics. His first book, The deacon in search of identity, was about a deacon in the Roman Catholic Church, published by Paulist Press in 1975.

He followed the widespread publicity about Karen Silkwood, her death, and the suit which her family brought against her former employer, Kerr-McGee. Her life and activism, and suspicious death, became the subject of his book, The Killing of Karen Silkwood: The Story Behind the Kerr-McGee Plutonium Case, published by Houghton-Mifflin in 1981.

Becoming interested in the story of resistance showed by hundreds of Jews who escaped from Sobibor, a German Nazi extermination camp in Poland, Rashke did research and interviewed survivors for his 1982 book, Escape from Sobibor. It was adapted as a 1987 TV movie by the same name, starring actors Alan Arkin and Rutger Hauer.

One of the survivors of Sobibor whom Rashke interviewed was Esther Terner Raab. As a result of her talks about her experience, she received many letters, which she shared with Rashke, as she said they helped her heal. His play about her and the influence of the letters, Dear Esther, premiered in 1998 in Washington, DC, at the U.S. Holocaust Memorial Museum.

Drawn to compelling personal stories, Rashke has studied subjects including Bill Lear, an aviation engineer and inventor who did not get beyond seventh grade.

Marriage and family
Rashke is married to Paula Kaufmann. They live in Beaver Dam, Wisconsin.

Bibliography

Books

{{cite book|last1=Parker|first1=Robert|title=Capitol Hill in Black and White (co-author)|date=1986|publisher=Dodd, Mead & Co.|location=New York|isbn=978-0-396-08670-3|url-access=registration|url=https://archive.org/details/capitolhillinbla00park}}

 In October 1943, Esther Terner and 300 other Jews escaped from Sobibor, a Nazi death camp in eastern Poland. It was the biggest escape of WWII and the subject of Escape from Sobibor. That book, and the movie based on it, brought Esther many invitations to speak in public schools. Her courageous story generated hundreds of letters from children expressing their love, concern and outrage. Those letters became the inspiration for the play, Dear Esther. This is a collection of the heartfelt letters, poems and drawings school children sent Esther, along with the play.

PlaysAsking For It (out of print)Bang! (out of print)Love in a Petri Dish (out of print)Pius (out of print)Season to Season'' (out of print)

References

External links

1936 births
Living people
American male journalists
Writers from Milwaukee